"Humility" is a single by British virtual band Gorillaz featuring American jazz guitarist George Benson. It was released on 31 May 2018 along with "Lake Zurich" as the first single from their sixth studio album, The Now Now. On 12 July 2018, two remixes of the song by Superorganism and DJ Koze were released.  It charted in a total of 8 countries reaching number 85 on the US Billboard Hot 100, with its highest position in any chart being number 7 in Billboard's Hot Rock Songs.

Promotion and release
The song was first announced on 30 May 2018 when Zane Lowe confirmed The Now Nows release and stated that Damon Albarn would be debuting the song on the Beats 1 program the following day. The next day, the song debuted with a music video featuring Jack Black and was digitally released along with another single, "Lake Zurich". On 13 May 2022, the music video was re-uploaded to the Gorillaz YouTube channel with commentary from virtual band member Murdoc Niccals.

Music video

The music video for the song was filmed in Venice Beach, Los Angeles, California and features Jack Black.

It begins with footage of 2-D roller-skating around Venice Beach interspersed with shots of Black playing a guitar. This sequence appears multiple times throughout the video, mainly in between the appearances of the different Gorillaz members. After the opening sequence, Noodle is shown checkmating Remi Kabaka, one of the producers for The Now Now and the voice actor of Russel, during a round of chess. Ace Copular (who replaced Murdoc while the latter was incarcerated) is then seen observing two men play basketball in front of a mural of George Benson. When the ball lands in his hands after a successful dunk by one of the players, he deflates it using a pocket knife, making it impossible for the game to continue. After this, various video clips of local residents are shown. Near the end of the video, Russel can be seen standing on the side of the boardwalk. When 2-D skates in his direction, he extends his leg and trips him. When 2-D recovers, his white eyes turn black, and he attempts to skate again, only to end up falling.

The video was produced by The Line in collaboration with Blinkink and Ruffian, with rotoscoping by Trace VFX. It was directed by Gorillaz co-creator Jamie Hewlett and co-directed by Tim McCourt, Max Taylor, and Evan Silver.

Remixes
On 12 July 2018, a single containing two remixes of the song by British indie pop band Superorganism and German EDM producer DJ Koze was released. The Superorganism remix adds lead singer Orono Noguchi's voice to the song along with a snippet of rap lyrics from another Gorillaz song, Clint Eastwood, while the DJ Koze remix is mostly instrumental.

Personnel
Damon Albarn – vocals, synthesizer, guitar, additional drum programming
George Benson – guitar, additional vocals
James Ford – bass guitar, synthesizer, drums
Remi Kabaka Jr. – percussion, drum programming
John Davis – mastering engineer
Mark DeCozio – additional engineering
Samuel Egglenton – engineering assistant
Stephen Sedgwick – mixing engineer, recording engineer, engineering

Charts

Weekly charts

Year-end charts

References

2018 songs
2018 singles
Gorillaz songs
George Benson songs
Songs written by Damon Albarn
Parlophone singles
Warner Records singles
Songs written by James Ford (musician)
Songs written by Remi Kabaka Jr.
Jazz fusion songs
British funk songs
Songs about loneliness